Scott Andrews (born 30 June 1994) is a Welsh rugby union player who plays for as a lock forward having previously played for Bedwas RFC, Cross Keys RFC and Newport RFC. He made his debut for the Dragons on 26 January 2016 versus Leinster. Scott also had a stint with English Championship side Ealing Trailfinders on a loan from the Dragons.

International
Andrews is a Wales under-20 international and featured in the 2014 IRB Junior World Championship.

References

External links 
Dragons profile

1994 births
Living people
Bedwas RFC players
Cross Keys RFC players
Dragons RFC players
Newport RFC players
Rugby union players from Cardiff
Welsh rugby union players
Rugby union locks